Lycodon gammiei, commonly known as Gammie's wolf snake, is a species of nonvenomous colubrid endemic to northern India.

Etymology
The specific name, gammiei, is in honor of naturalist James Alexander Gammie (1839–1924), who managed a Cinchona plantation in Darjeeling from 1865 to 1897.

Geographic range
In India Lycodon gammiei is found in the states of Arunachal Pradesh and Sikkim, and in Darjeeling district in the state of West Bengal.

Description
At first glance, Gammie's wolf snake resembles the venomous kraits. Its body is surrounded by alternating dark and light rings with irregular margins.  Its head is dark olive, and there are light spots in the center of most head shields. It has an imperfect pale collar, and the underside of the head and neck are whitish. Adults are about 80 cm (32 inches) in total length (including tail).

References

Further reading
Blanford WT (1878). "Notes on some Reptilia from the Himalayas and Burma". J. Asiatic Soc. Bengal 47 (part 2): 125–131. (Ophites gammiei, new species, pp. 130–131). (in English and Latin).
Boulenger GA (1890). The Fauna of British India, Including Ceylon and Burma. Reptilia and Batrachia. London: Secretary of State for India in Council. (Taylor and Francis, printers). xviii + 541 pp. (Lycodon gammiei, new combination, p. 296).
Wall F (1923). "A Hand-list of the Snakes of the Indian Empire. Part 2". J. Bombay Nat. Hist. Soc. 29: 598–632. (Dinodon gammiei, new combination, p. 615).
Smith MA (1943). The Fauna of British India, Ceylon and Burma, Including the Whole of the Indo-Chinese Sub-region. Reptilia and Amphibia. Vol. III.—Serpentes. London: Secretary of State for India. (Taylor and Francis, printers). xii + 583 pp. (Dinodon gammiei, p. 271).
Mistry, V. 2007. Rediscovery of the Sikkim False Wolf Snake. Hornbill (Jul-Sep): 18-19
Mistry, V.; Vogel, G. & Tillack, F. 2007. Rediscovery of Dinodon gammiei (BLANFORD 1878) (Serpentes, Colubridae), with description of its validity. Hamadryad 31 (2): 265-273
Agarwal I., Mistry V. K., Athreya R. 2010. A preliminary checklist of the reptiles of Eaglenest Wildlife Sanctuary, West Kameng district, Arunachal Pradesh, India. Russian Journal of Herpetology 17 (2): 81 – 93
Athreya, R. 2006. Eaglenest Biodiversity Project (2003 – 2006): Conservation resources for Eaglenest wildlife sanctuary. Kaati Trust, Pune, 196 pp.

External links
 https://web.archive.org/web/20140826121733/http://naturecon.org/index.php/eaglenest-sanctuary/biodiversity-discoveries/the-darjeeling-false-wolf-snake-dinodon-gammiei-a-rediscovered-snake

gammiei
Reptiles of India
Endemic fauna of India
Reptiles described in 1878